Michael Goodrich may refer to:
 Michael T. Goodrich, mathematician and computer scientist
 T. Michael Goodrich, CEO and chairman of BE&K